Game of Bros is a New Zealand reality television / game show that aired on Māori Television and which premiered on 17 March 2016. In a format compared to The Bachelor New Zealand, several Pacific Island men compete for the attention of two women comedians, Anapela Polataivao and Goretti Chadwick.

Cast 
Season 1

Hosts: Anapela Polataivao and Goretti Chadwick.

Winner: Louis Ova

Contestants:

 Louis Ova
 Joe Mc'Cormack
 Jordan Cruickshank
 Paul J Ah Kuoi
 Zephaniah Sao-Mafiti
 Thierry Martel
 Michael Koloi
 Elia Antonio
 Yanique Michaels
 Ramon Betham
 James Russell
 Selwyn Te Pania

Season 2

Hosts: Anapela Polataivao and Goretti Chadwick.

Game master: Wairangi Koopu

Contestants:

 Josh Tupou
 Roranin Arakua
 Jasom Sawyer
 Carlos Ulberg
 Joash Fahitua
 Oscar Kettle
 Ammon Johnson
 Rakena Takarei
 Phoenix Puleanga
 Jesse Elliot

Season 3

The third season included both male and female celebrity contestants, vying to win $10,000 for a charity of their choice.

Host/game master: Wairangi Koopu

Contestants:

 Miriama Smith, actress
 Jimi Jackson, comedian
 Kihi Ririnui, TV presenter
 Carlos Ulberg, pro fighter (who also competed in season 2)
 Makere Gibbons, tennis pro
 Tumehe Rongonui, TV presenter
 Gloria Blake, model
 Shimpal Lelisi, actor
 Dave Letele, boxer
 Kai Kara-France, MMA fighter

Production 
The show was announced on 2016.

The show premiered on 17 March 2016.

In 2016 the show was renewed for a second season.

The second season premiered on 22 March 2017.

Season 3 premiered on May 3, 2018

References

External links
 Maori Television: Game of Bros

New Zealand reality television series
2016 New Zealand television series debuts
Māori Television original programming